Pakistan participated at the 1966 Commonwealth Games in Kingston, Jamaica.

Medalists

Medals by sport

References

 http://www.sports.gov.pk/Participation/1966_BE&C_Games.htm

Pakistan at the Commonwealth Games
Nations at the 1966 British Empire and Commonwealth Games